Vyond (formerly known as GoAnimate until 2018; stylized as Go!Animate until 2013) is an American cloud-based animated video creation platform.

History
Vyond was founded as GoAnimate in 2007 by Alvin Hung, and the first version of GoAnimate went live in mid-2008. 

In May 2009, DomoAnimate was launched. This program allowed users to create GoAnimations based on the Domo shorts. On September 15, 2014, the DomoAnimate site closed down and was later redirected to the GoAnimate for Schools website.

In March 2011, GoAnimate - along with Stupeflix Video Maker and Xtranormal Movie Maker - became a founding partner of YouTube Create, a suite of apps available to content creators within YouTube, which was resulted in the increase of popularity. This suite had more apps added later on and was ultimately retired in early 2013.

A U.S. office in San Francisco opened in June 2011. In late August 2011, GoAnimate for Schools was publicly launched. GoAnimate for Schools was a school-safe version of GoAnimate featuring dedicated privacy, security, content moderation and group management features. In October 2011, a custom set of “Election 2012” characters became popular.

On , GoAnimate launched the Business Friendly Theme, the first of the four Business Themes on the site. In April 2012, the first business-oriented subscription plans were publicly launched. These included 1080p download, logo removal & replacement, and new business-oriented visual themes. These plans led to increased popularity and exposure for GoAnimate.

By July 2013, over ten million videos had been created using the GoAnimate platform.

On , GoAnimate changed its logo, removing the exclamation mark. That same day, the site relaunched with a new user interface, plus the removal of GoBucks and GoPoints. 

At the end of 2013, the "paper cutout" assets of explainer video pioneer Common Craft were integrated into GoAnimate as a new visual theme. In April 2014, multi-seat business subscription plans were launched, including full-featured administrative tools along with group collaboration and review. Around the same time, GoAnimate also released their next Business theme, that being Whiteboard Animation, and a publishing integration with e-learning courseware authoring platform Lectora.

By the end of 2014, GoAnimate's library contained over 10,000 assets, including a new set of Supreme Court justices and settings. In 2015, the Taiwan office was opened. making it GoAnimate's third location (after Hong Kong and San Francisco).

As of May 2015, GoAnimate announced future expansion plans included going public, but there had been no decision on the listing venue. During the summer of 2015, social network features such as favorites, comments and messages were removed so that GoAnimate could focus more on businesses and marketing.

On October 19, 2015, it was announced that GoAnimate would migrate from Adobe Flash and go towards HTML5 animation, which can allow mobile device compatibility. The older, less technological-adaptable themes (or non-business themes) such as Lil' Peepz, Comedy World, Anime, Stick Figure, and Cartoon Classics were retired as they were incompatible with HTML5. GoAnimate for Schools, however, retained Adobe Flash and the non-business themes until July 26, 2016.

On November 25, 2015, GoAnimate replaced their free plan with a trial plan that lasts 14 days. After the subscription expires, the ability to create or edit videos is locked until a paid plan is subscribed to. By the end of 2015, the company had over 50 employees.

On May 6, 2018, GoAnimate was renamed Vyond after the company had revealed its launching to occur at an exhibition in San Diego a day later. The trading name for Vyond remains as "GoAnimate, Inc.".

On May 6, 2019, Vyond announced the retirement of the legacy video maker, due to the end-of-life of Adobe Flash, which occurred in December 2019. All user accounts defaulted to Vyond Studio on August 14, 2019.

Product
Vyond provides its users with a library containing tens of thousands of pre-animated assets, which can be controlled through a drag & drop interface. Asset types include characters, actions, templates, props, text boxes, music tracks, and sound effects. Users can also upload their own assets, such as audio files, image files, or video files. There is also a drag & drop composition tool, which users can employ to create pans and zooms.

Spoken dialogue and narration can be recorded directly into the platform or imported as an audio file. Characters can automatically lip-sync the dialogue that is assigned to them. Alternatively, audio can be set as voiceover narration. Users can download their finished videos as MP4 files, GIFs, or video presentations. They can also export them directly to a variety of video-hosting sites including YouTube, Wistia, Vidyard, Vimeo, Vzaar and WeVideo.

Another version of GoAnimate was also available, simply called GoAnimate for Schools. On April 10, 2018, Vyond announced that GoAnimate for Schools would be shutting down on June 30, 2019. On that same day, GoAnimate removed its 14-day free trial to the schools site. Subscription purchases and renewals on Goanimate4schools.com were later removed on May 6, 2018, with product support and service officially terminating on June 30, 2019.

See also
 Animaker

References

External links
 

Animation software
Marketing companies established in 2007
2007 establishments in California
Privately held companies based in California
Companies based in San Mateo, California
Websites about animation
Internet properties established in 2007
American companies established in 2007
Software companies based in the San Francisco Bay Area
Software companies of the United States
Internet memes